
Year 251 (CCLI) was a common year starting on Wednesday (link will display the full calendar) of the Julian calendar. At the time, it was known as the Year of the Consulship of Traianus and Etruscus (or, less frequently, year 1004 Ab urbe condita). The denomination 251 for this year has been used since the early medieval period, when the Anno Domini calendar era became the prevalent method in Europe for naming years.

Events 
 By place 
 Roman Empire 
 July 1 – Battle of Abritus: The Goths defeat Emperor Decius and his son Herennius Etruscus, on swampy ground in the Dobruja (Moesia).  
 In Rome, Hostilian, son of Decius, succeeds his father, while Trebonianus Gallus is proclaimed Emperor by the troops. Gallus accepts him as co-emperor, but an outbreak of plague strikes the city, and kills Hostilian.
 The prosperity of Roman Britain declines during this period, as the Germanic tribes of the Franks and Saxons, whose homelands are in Friesland and the Low Countries, make raids around the southeast coast.
 Gallus makes peace with the Goths; he permits them to keep their plunder, and offers them a bribe not to return.  
 A 15-year plague begins in the Roman Empire.

 Persia 
 Sassanid King Shapur I orders an invasion of Syria, with the intent of finally capturing the city of Antioch during the campaign of 251–254.

 China 
 Wang Ling's rebellion against the Wei regent Sima Yi is quelled.
 Sima Yi passes away in Luoyang.
 Sima Shi, Sima Yi's eldest son, inherits his father's authority.

 By topic 
 Religion 
 March – Pope Cornelius succeeds Pope Fabian as the 21st pope.

Births 
 January 12 – Anthony the Great, Christian monk and saint (d. 356)

Deaths 
 February 5 – Cao Lin, Chinese prince of the Cao Wei state
 June – August
 Decius, Roman emperor (killed after the battle of Abritus)
 Herennius Etruscus, Roman emperor and son of Decius
 June 15 – Wang Ling, Chinese general and politician
 August 22 – Zhen, Chinese empress of the Cao Wei state
 September 7 – Sima Yi, Chinese general and regent (b. 179)
 Agatha of Sicily, Christian martyr and saint (approximate date)
 Cao Biao, Chinese prince of the Cao Wei state (b. 195)
 Deng Zhi, Chinese general, politician and diplomat
 Hostilian, Roman emperor (of plague in Rome)
 Lü Yi, Chinese official, governor and politician

References